Hubert Fol (November 11, 1925, Paris – January 19, 1995, Paris) was a French jazz saxophonist and bandleader.

Fol was Raymond Fol's brother, and learned piano from an early age through lessons from his mother. He also took lessons in violin and clarinet in his teens and early twenties. As a saxophonist, he worked with Claude Abadie and Boris Vian and co-founded the Be Bop Minstrels with his brother in 1947. In 1949–1950, he toured Europe and recorded with Coleman Hawkins, then worked with Kenny Clarke and Django Reinhardt before embarking on another European tour with Dizzy Gillespie and Rex Stewart. Fol's health deteriorated in the 1960s, which led to his playing far less frequently.

References
André Clergeat and Barry Kernfeld, "Hubert Fol". The New Grove Dictionary of Jazz. 2nd edition, 2001.

1925 births
1995 deaths
French jazz saxophonists
Male saxophonists
French jazz bandleaders
Musicians from Paris
20th-century saxophonists
20th-century French male musicians
French male jazz musicians